Enjoy Your Life may refer to:

Music
Enjoy Your Life, the 2019 debut album by Lady Donli
"Enjoy Your Life", song by the American funk/R&B band Cameo from the 1982 album Alligator Woman
"Enjoy Your Life", song from the single "Upside Down" by Diana Ross
"Enjoy Your Life", song by Marina from the 2019 album Love + Fear

Other
Enjoy Your Life!, 2016 photo exhibitions by Juergen Teller